Richard McAllister Warwick (April 25, 1927 – June 21, 2015) was a Canadian ice hockey player with the Penticton Vees. He won a gold medal at the 1955 World Ice Hockey Championships in West Germany. He also played for the New Westminster Royals, Nanaimo Clippers, Tacoma Rockets, Trail Smoke Eaters, Kamloops Chiefs, Kitchener-Waterloo Dutchmen.

References

1927 births
2015 deaths
Canadian ice hockey centres
Ice hockey people from Saskatchewan
Sportspeople from Regina, Saskatchewan